Sun Feifei (born February 21, 1981) is a Chinese actress.

Career
In 1993, she started her education at the Beijing Dance Academy as a middle school student and then subsequently joined the Department of Chinese classical dance at the academy. After graduating from the academy, she chose to commence a career as an actress. In the serial Perfect Father, she portrayed a cute girl. Impressed by her lovely appearance and ingenuous temperament, the TV fans began to become acquainted with the new star. In 2009, Sun starred in a historical serial Kongque dong nan fei (孔雀东南飞), which featured a melancholy romance.

Filmography

Film

Television

See also
Cinema of China

References

External links

 Sun Feifei Library

1981 births
Actresses from Shaanxi
Living people
Actresses from Xi'an
Chinese television actresses
Chinese film actresses
Beijing Dance Academy alumni